Abdoulaye Coulibaly may refer to:

 Abdoulaye Coulibaly (footballer born 1988), Senegalese footballer for AS Saint-Étienne
 Abdoulaye Coulibaly (footballer born 1976), Ivorian footballer for ES Uzès Pont du Gard 
 Abdoulaye Coulibaly, Malian chess player